Khvoshinan-e Vosta (also Romanized as Khvoshīnān-e Vosţá and Khūshīnān-e Vosţá; also known as Khoshnīān-e Vasaţī, Khowshīnah Tappeh, Khushinān-i-Tappeh, Khushinān-i-Tepe, Khvoshī Nān-e Tappeh, Khvoshīnān-e Tappeh Vasaţī, and Khvoshīnān Tappeh) is a village in Miyan Darband Rural District, in the Central District of Kermanshah County, Kermanshah Province, Iran. At the 2006 census, its population was 126, in 34 families.

References 

Populated places in Kermanshah County